There were 20 teams in the 1993 Tour de France, each composed of 9 cyclists. The first 14 teams were selected in May 1993, based on the FICP ranking; in June 1993, six additional wildcards were given; one of the wildcards was given to a combination of two teams (Chazal and Subaru). The Subaru team did not want to be part of a mixed team, so Chazal was allowed to send a full team.

Teams

Qualified teams

Invited teams

Cyclists

By starting number

By team

By nationality

References

1993 Tour de France
1993